The Isa is a river of Belarus. It is a right tributary of the Shchara, which it joins in the city of Slonim.

Rivers of Brest Region
Rivers of Grodno Region
Rivers of Belarus